Nås is a locality situated in Vansbro Municipality, Dalarna County, Sweden with 417 inhabitants in 2010.

It was the birthplace of Lewis Larsson and provided inspiration for Selma Lagerlöf's novel Jerusalem.

References 

Populated places in Dalarna County
Populated places in Vansbro Municipality